Robertson-Wesley United Church is a church located a short distance west of the downtown core of the city of Edmonton, Alberta, Canada in the neighbourhood of Oliver.

Robertson-Wesley is a congregation of the United Church of Canada.

The current congregation was formed in 1971 when the congregations of Robertson United Church and Wesley United Church merged. The new congregation moved into the Robertson United Church building.

The church building is an example of High Victorian Gothic Revival architecture featuring a barrel vaulted ceiling, curved pews, and excellent acoustics.

Predecessor churches

Robertson United Church (Robertson Presbyterian Church)

Robertson Presbyterian Church was formed in 1909 as an offshoot of First Presbyterian Church. The first meetings of the new congregation were held in the basement of First Presbyterian until a new building was built in 1910. The new congregation was named for Presbyterian Missionary Superintendent James Robertson.

Robertson Presbyterian soon outgrew its original church building, and a new building was constructed on the north east corner of 123 Street and 102 Avenue in 1913. The first service was held in the new building in early 1914.

In 1925, the membership of Robertson voted to join the United Church of Canada, which was founded that year. The name of the church changed to Robertson United Church.

In 1971, Robertson formally merged with Wesley United Church, forming Robertson-Wesley United Church.

Wesley United Church (Wesley Methodist Church)
Wesley Methodist Church was founded in 1907. It was the fourth Methodist church established in Edmonton on the north side of the North Saskatchewan River, the other three being McDougall, Norwood and Grace. Originally, the congregation of Wesley met in a tent, but soon moved to a new wood-frame church building located just north of Jasper Avenue.

Like Robertson, Wesley outgrew its original building, and in 1913 moved to a new building on the south west corner of 117 Street and 102 Avenue. The congregation continued to use this building right up to the end of 1970.

In 1925, the membership of Wesley voted to join the United Church of Canada. The name of the church changed to Wesley United Church.

In 1971, Wesley merged with Robertson United. Arrangements were made to incorporate many memorials from the Wesley church building into the Robertson church building. The Wesley building was later sold to the Canadian Native Friendship Centre. Funds from the sale were placed in trust for community development.

Notable people associated with Robertson-Wesley
 Rev. L. Bruce Miller, former minister elected to the Alberta Legislature in 2004

References

External links
 "Robertson-Wesley United Church website

Churches in Edmonton
United Church of Canada churches in Alberta
Gothic Revival architecture in Edmonton
Municipal Historic Resources of Edmonton
Music venues in Edmonton
Christian organizations established in 1971
Churches completed in 1910
20th-century Presbyterian churches
Gothic Revival church buildings in Canada
20th-century churches in Canada